Larbaa may refer to:

 Larbaa, Blida – a commune or municipality of Blida province, Algeria
 Larbaa, Batna – a commune or municipality of Batna province, Algeria
 Larbaa, Tissemsilt – a commune or municipality of Tissemsilt province, Algeria